Lang Sound is a sound  wide at its narrowest point and  long, lying between the group of islands that includes Broka Island and Havstein Island and Law Promontory. It was mapped by Norwegian cartographers from aerial photographs taken by the Lars Christensen Expedition in January–February 1937 and named Langsundet (the long sound).

References

External links

Sounds of Antarctica
Bodies of water of Kemp Land